Wörpe is a river in the northern part of the state of Lower Saxony in Germany, a tributary of the Wümme.

From there the Wörpe flows through Wilstedt and Grasberg before finally discharging into the Wümme near Lilienthal. The course of the Wörpe was artificially changed in the past. It was first re-routed between 1826 and 1864 in order to improve the passage of peat barges.

See also
List of rivers of Lower Saxony

References

Rivers of Lower Saxony
Osterholz
Rivers of Germany